Christopher Charles Rowland (born 21 May 1947) is an English Anglican priest and theologian. He was Dean Ireland's Professor of the Exegesis of Holy Scripture at the University of Oxford from 1991 to 2014.

Life
Rowland was born on 21 May 1947 in Doncaster, then in the West Riding of Yorkshire, and was educated at Doncaster Grammar School. He then studied at Christ's College, Cambridge, and for ordination in the Church of England at Ridley Hall, Cambridge.

He was ordained deacon in 1975 and priest in 1976, serving as curate at two parishes in the Newcastle upon Tyne area (Benwell 1975–1978, Gosforth 1978–1979).  Between 1974 and 1979, he lectured in religious studies at Newcastle University, returning to Cambridge as a Fellow of Jesus College, Cambridge, in 1979.  He was an assistant lecturer in divinity at the university from 1983 to 1985, then lecturer from 1985 to 1991.

In 1991, he was appointed Dean Ireland's Professor of the Exegesis of Holy Scripture at the University of Oxford, a post that carries with it a fellowship at The Queen's College, Oxford. He retired from Oxford in 2014 and was appointed professor emeritus. He was appointed Canon Theologian of Liverpool Cathedral in 2005.

He influenced the scholars Michael J. Gorman and Robin Griffith-Jones

Works

Books

 - differently titled US edition

Articles

Festschriften

References

1947 births
20th-century Anglican theologians
20th-century English Anglican priests
20th-century English theologians
21st-century Anglican theologians
21st-century English Anglican priests
21st-century English theologians
Alumni of Christ's College, Cambridge
Academics of Newcastle University
Anglican socialists
Christian radicals
Church of England priests
Dean Ireland's Professors of the Exegesis of Holy Scripture
English Anglican theologians
English Christian socialists
Fellows of Jesus College, Cambridge
Fellows of The Queen's College, Oxford
Living people